Tysnes is a municipality in Vestland county, Norway. It is located in the traditional district of Sunnhordland. The administrative centre is the village of Uggdal. Other population centres in Tysnes include the villages of Våge and Onarheim. The island municipality is located in a group of islands near the mouth of the Hardangerfjorden. The majority of the municipal population lives on the island of Tysnesøya, the largest island in the municipality.

The  municipality is the 283rd largest by area out of the 356 municipalities in Norway. Tysnes is the 234th most populous municipality in Norway with a population of 2,883.

General information
{{Historical populations
|footnote = Source: Statistics Norway.
|shading = off
|align=left
|1951|3866
|1960|3559
|1970|3019
|1980|2774
|1990|2915
|2000|2843
|2010|2779
|2019|2846
}}
The historic parish of Tysnæs was established as a municipality on 1 January 1838 (see formannskapsdistrikt law). On 1 January 1907, the small portion of Tysnes located on the mainland (population: 67) was transferred to the neighboring municipality of Kvinnherad. The municipal borders have not changed since that time.

Name
The municipality (originally the parish) are named after the old Tysnes farm, since the first Tysnes Church was built here. The first element is the genitive case of the name of the god Tyr and the last element is nes which means "headland".

This is probably the only place in Norway named after the god Tyr. Several place names around the farm also have sacred meanings: Ve (holy place), Helgastein (holy rock), Godøy (the god's island), and Vevatnet (the holy lake). The old name of the big island of Tysnesøy was Njarðarlǫg (the district of the god Njord). Recently, a sun phenomenon connected to the original Tysnes headland has been discovered, and this seems to be the starting-point of the sacral name complex.

Coat of arms
The coat of arms was granted on 28 October 1971. The arms are derived from the seal of the medieval Onarheim guild. Onarheim is a village on the island of Tysnesøya. It was historically a Viking Age center of power in the Sunnhordland region. The village is now part of Tysnes municipality. The arms show two crossed silver axes on a blue background. There is a silver chevron above the axes which was added to the municipal arms to distinguish it from the medieval arms.

Churches
The Church of Norway has three parishes within the municipality of Tysnes. It is part of the Sunnhordland prosti (deanery) in the Diocese of Bjørgvin.

Government
All municipalities in Norway, including Tysnes, are responsible for primary education (through 10th grade), outpatient health services, senior citizen services, unemployment and other social services, zoning, economic development, and municipal roads. The municipality is governed by a municipal council of elected representatives, which in turn elect a mayor.  The municipality falls under the Haugaland og Sunnhordland District Court and the Gulating Court of Appeal.

Municipal council
The municipal council of Tysnes is made up of 21 representatives that are elected to four year terms. The party breakdown of the council is as follows:

Mayor
The mayors of Tysnes (incomplete list):
2015–present: Kåre Martin Kleppe (H)
2011-2015: Kjetil Hestad (Ap)
2003-2011: Helge Hauge (Sp)
1995-2003: Lorentz Lunde (KrF)
1983-1995: Helge Hauge (Sp)

Geography
The municipality consists of a group of islands, located south of the city of Bergen where the Hardangerfjorden and the coastal archipelago meet. The Bjørnafjorden lies north of the municipality and the Langenuen strait runs along the western side of the municipality. The largest of these islands, named Tysnesøya, can be reached from the mainland either by ferry to the village of Våge on the north side of the island or by the road bridge constructed on the eastern side of the island. The second largest island is Reksteren, which is connected to Tysnesøya by a small road bridge.

Media
The newspaper Tysnes'' has been published in Tysnes since 1953.

Notable people 
 Anders Mowatt of Hugoland (ca. 1530 – ca. 1610 in Tysnes) a Scottish merchant, navy admiral and landowner
 Axel Mowat (1592 in Tysnes – 1661) a Norwegian naval officer and land owner becoming Barony Rosendal
 Karen Mowat (ca. 1630 in Tysnes – 1675) a Norwegian noblewoman, heiress and landowner of Scottish origins
 Claus Pavels Riis (1826–1886) a Norwegian author, settled in Tysnes as a landowner and gardener
 Olav Gurvin (1893 in Tysnes – 1974) a Norwegian musicologist and academic
 Johannes Heggland (1919 in Tysnes – 2008) a novelist, short story and children's literature writer, playwright and politician
 Magnus Aarbakke (born 1934 in Tysnes) a Norwegian judge, Supreme Court Justice 1994 to 2002

Gallery

References

External links

 Municipal fact sheet from Statistics Norway 
 Tysnes municipality home page
 Tysnes newspaper 
 Tysnesingen online newspaper 
 Video about the sun phenomenon connected to the Tysnes headland, pre-Christian cult and the sacral place names in the area

 
Municipalities of Vestland
1838 establishments in Norway